Krasnaya Yablon is a rural locality (a village) in Denisovskoye Rural Settlement, Gorokhovetsky District, Vladimir Oblast, Russia. The population was 5 as of 2010.

Geography 
Krasnaya Yablon is located 24 km southwest of Gorokhovets (the district's administrative centre) by road. Telepovo is the nearest rural locality.

References 

Rural localities in Gorokhovetsky District